Samson Cherargei  is a Kenyan politician who is the current senator representing Nandi County.

References

21st-century Kenyan politicians
Year of birth missing (living people)
Living people
Members of the 12th Parliament of Kenya
Members of the 13th Parliament of Kenya
People from Nandi County